Carlü Johann Sadie (born 7 May 1997) is a South African rugby union player for  in the United Rugby Championship. His regular position is prop.

References

1997 births
Living people
Golden Lions players
Lions (United Rugby Championship) players
Rugby union players from Bellville, South Africa
Rugby union props
South Africa Under-20 international rugby union players
South African rugby union players
Stade Français players
Stormers players
Western Province (rugby union) players
Sharks (rugby union) players
Sharks (Currie Cup) players